Jerzu (Sardinian: Jersu), is a comune (municipality) in the Province of Nuoro in the Italian region Sardinia, located about  northeast of Cagliari and about  southwest of Tortolì. Jerzu is known for the production of a particular type of wine, called Cannonau di Jerzu.

Jerzu borders the following municipalities: Arzana, Cardedu, Gairo, Lanusei, Osini, Tertenia, Ulassai, Villaputzu.

Demographic evolution

References